Spoiwo is a musical group created in 2009 in Gdańsk, Poland. Until the end of 2018, the band had five members. In 2019, two of the members left the band (Simona Jambor and Paweł Bereszczyński), and instead they were joined by Patryk Piątkowski.
On 13 March 2015, Spoiwo released their debut album, Salute Solitude.
They played at many post-rock festivals, including Dunk!festival, Whoneedslyrics?! festival, and various Polish events such as OFF Festival and Expect Delays Fest. They have shared the stage with bands like God is an Astronaut, Maybeshewill, Explosions in the Sky, Sleepmakeswaves, and many more.

Band members
Current members
 Piotr Gierzyński
  Patryk Piątkowski (since 2019)
 Krzysztof Zaczyński
 Krzysztof Sarnek

Past members
 Paweł Bereszczyński (2009–2018)
 Simona Jambor (2010–2018)

Nominations
 Discovery of the Year for "Pomeranian Storms"
 Best band of 2015 for Arctic Drones
 11th best post-rock album of 2015 for Arctic Drones
 Best post-rock album of 2015 by postrockerNL
 Best debut of 2015 and best Polish post-rock album of 2015 by Post-Rock Pl
 Top 10 best Polish albums of 2015 by Music Is
 Top 20 most interesting Polish albums of 2015 by Uwolnij Muzykę
 Pomeranian Music Award DOKI 2015 -  nominations in the categories Album of the Year, Artist of the Year, and New Face; won in New Face category
 Best concert band by Pomeranian Music Award DOKI 2016

References

External links
 https://www.facebook.com/Spoiwo/
 https://spoiwo.bandcamp.com/

Polish rock music groups
Post-rock groups